is a railway station on the Hohi Main Line operated by JR Kyushu in Aso, Kumamoto, Japan.

Lines

Layout 
The station consists of a side platform serving a single tracks at grade. The station building is wooden structure of traditional Japanese design with a tiled roof. It is, however, unstaffed, and the main part of the building is now used by the local chamber of commerce and thus not accessible to passengers. Instead, the platform is accessed through a passage beside the building. On the platform facing the track, an annex of the station building has been opened up as a waiting room.

Adjacent stations

History
The track was extended westwards in phases, with  being established as its western terminus  on 30 November 1925. This track was also extended in phases, reaching  as its eastern terminus on 25 January 1918. On 2 December 1928, Miyaji and Tamarai were linked up, with Takimizu opening on the same day as one of several intermediate stations along the new track. Through-traffic was established between Kumamoto and Ōita. The Inukai and Miyaji lines were merged and the entire stretch redesignated as the Hōhi Main Line. With the privatization of Japanese National Railways (JNR), the successor of JGR, on 1 April 1987, Takimizu came under the control of JR Kyushu.

On 17 September 2017, Typhoon Talim (Typhoon 18) damaged the Hōhi Main Line at several locations. Services between Aso and Nakahanda, including Takimizu, were suspended and replaced by bus services. Rail service from Aso through this station to Miemachi was restored by 22 September 2017 Normal rail services between Aso and Ōita were restored by 2 October 2017.

Environs
Aso City Hall Namino Branch
Namino Post office

See also
List of railway stations in Japan

References

External links
Takimizu (JR Kyushu)

Railway stations in Kumamoto Prefecture
Railway stations in Japan opened in 1928